Yomi Samuele Scintu  (born 20 May 1997) is a German footballer who plays as a forward for Oberliga Baden-Württemberg club Sonnenhof Großaspach.

He was born to a Nigerian mother and an Italian father.

Career 

After three seasons with VfB Eichstätt in Germany, Scintu joined USL Championship side Bethlehem Steel on 7 March 2019.

On 18 June 2021, Scintu signed with 3. Liga side Türkgücü München.

Scintu joined recently relegated Oberliga Baden-Württemberg club Sonnenhof Großaspach on 20 September 2022.

References

External links 
 

1997 births
Living people
Italian footballers
Democratic Republic of the Congo footballers
Italian expatriate footballers
Democratic Republic of the Congo expatriate footballers
VfB Eichstätt players
Philadelphia Union II players
Türkgücü München players
SG Sonnenhof Großaspach players
Association football forwards
USL Championship players
3. Liga players
Bayernliga players
Oberliga (football) players
Footballers from Munich